Larry Clavier (born January 9, 1981 in Bondy, France) is a Guadeloupean midfielder.

Domestic career
Clavier previously played for Portuguese side SC Freamunde and Angers SCO, helping them gain promotion from the Championnat National to Ligue 2 in the 2006–07 season.

On 4 April 2012, Clavier signed a contract with V-League side, Dong Tam Long An FC.

International career
Clavier was called up to the Guadeloupe squad for the 2009 CONCACAF Gold Cup.

International goals
Scores and results list Guadeloupe's goal tally first.

References

External links

Guadeloupean expatriate footballers
1981 births
Living people
Racing Club de France Football players
Angers SCO players
Larry Clavier
2009 CONCACAF Gold Cup players
2011 CONCACAF Gold Cup players
Guadeloupe international footballers
S.C. Freamunde players
Association football midfielders
French expatriate sportspeople in Thailand
Guadeloupean footballers